Newton Abbot railway station serves the town of Newton Abbot in Devon, England. The station today is managed by Great Western Railway, who provide train services along with CrossCountry.

For many years, it was also the junction for the branch line to Moretonhampstead and the site of a large locomotive workshop.

History

Broad gauge

The station was opened by the South Devon Railway Company on 30 December 1846 when its line was extended from Teignmouth railway station. The Moretonhampstead and South Devon Railway opened its branch line on 26 June 1866. All these railways used the  broad gauge.

Approaching the station from the town along Queen Street, people first saw the large goods shed. On the opposite side of the line was the pumping house for the atmospheric railway system that powered the trains for a short while. The passenger station was situated to the south of these buildings. It originally consisted to two – later three – small train sheds covering separate platforms for trains running in each direction to Exeter, Plymouth, and Torquay. It was rebuilt in 1861 as a single station with a larger train shed covering all three platforms.

On 1 February 1876 the South Devon Railway, which had already amalgamated with the Moretonhampstead company, was amalgamated into the Great Western Railway. The station was originally known as just "Newton" but this was changed to "Newton Abbot" on 1 March 1877.

The last broad gauge train ran on 20 May 1892, after which all the lines in the area were converted to  standard gauge over the space of a weekend. The workshops at Newton Abbot played a part in converting broad gauge locomotives, carriages and wagons to standard gauge over the following months.

A new station
Plans were put forward to rebuild the station with four platforms, but World War I delayed the plans. The goods facilities were moved onto the Moretonhampstead branch line on 12 June 1911, and some sidings were laid at Hackney on 17 December 1911 to replace those near the engine shed. These alterations paved the way for the expansion of the station following the war, the rebuilt station eventually being opened by Lord Mildmay of Flete on 11 April 1927. The station, built to the designs of the Chief Architect of the Great Western Railway, Percy Emerson Culverhouse, now faced the town along Queen Street rather than the old wooden goods shed.

An old broad gauge 0-4-0 locomotive, Tiny, was put on display on the station platform to provide a link with the past.

The southbound platform had to be rebuilt again following an air raid on 20 August 1940, during World War II. Six bombs were dropped (one failed to explode), killing 14 people.

The Moretonhampstead line lost its passenger trains on 28 February 1959. Goods trains were cut back to Bovey railway station from 6 April 1964 and from 6 July 1970 were run no further than Heathfield. The final regular traffic ran in 1996.

Recent history

The last trains used the former Platform 4 on 24 April 1987; the removal of the platform allowed a level entrance to be opened from the road and an extended car park to be built. Also removed were the loop lines that allowed fast trains to pass the station without passing a platform. Resignalling was completed over the following week and bank holiday weekend. Full operation was restored from 5 May 1987, now controlled from the panel signal box at Exeter. A new junction was installed for the Paignton branch and the signals now allow trains to run either way on each track.

Some of the signalling equipment was taken to the Newton Abbot Town and GWR Museum, where it forms part of an interactive display that shows how the railway shaped the town. It was also at about this time that Tiny was removed from its position on the platform and moved to Buckfastleigh railway station where it is displayed in the museum of the South Devon Railway Trust.

The remaining section of the Moretonhampstead line was taken out of use in 2009 when 'temporary stop blocks' were placed on the line  from the junction at Newton Abbot. The line to Heathfield has since been re-opened, seeing daily timber trains in 2012 to Chirk in Wales.

After many years as an 'open station', new ticket barriers were installed in August 2017.

Accidents and incidents
Newton Abbot has proved to be an accident-prone station. On 22 August 1851 the locomotive Brigand was derailed and Switchman Bidgood had to pay one pound towards its repairs.

The investigation into a collision in August 1875 revealed that it was normal practice at Newton to ignore the signal that controlled movements from the siding to the main line, as a result of which it was decided to interlock the signals and points here, one of the first such installations to be authorised on the South Devon Railway.

On 21 October 1892 an engine shunting the siding at Aller Junction derailed and fell on its side.

Thirty-one people were injured. Then in March 1997 a similar train from London was derailed by a bearing failure as it approached the station.

Description

The main entrance is on the west side of the station (at the top of the diagram, right), facing Courtenay Park and Queen Street which leads into the town centre. The main entrance is through South Devon House, the building opened in 1927. This involves a couple of steps up to the platform, but a step-free route leads from the taxi rank on the south side of the building. The car park is beyond this on the site of the former Platform 4. At the north end of this platform are a former terminal platform and sidings alongside Tucker's Maltings which used to serve the Moretonhampstead branch.

There are now just three tracks in use for passenger trains. The platform nearest the entrance (Platform 3) is used by most trains running beyond Exeter to London, the north of England and Scotland. A wide footbridge, which is served by both stairs and lifts, leads to the southbound platform.

Trains from Paignton can use either side of the station. Long-distance services are generally switched to the main line south of the station so use the same platform as trains from Plymouth, while local trains to Exeter and  tend to run the "wrong way" through the same platform that they use when running to Paignton, and then join the main line north of the station. Similarly, trains to Paignton often use the Plymouth platform if another train is blocking the usual Paignton platform.

Around the station

The industrial area opposite the station was the site of the South Devon Railway workshops; its engine shed was situated a little to the north of the station. Beyond this was the Hackney marshalling yard, where goods trains were, and still are from time to time, reformed for the journey over the hills towards Plymouth.

Hackney Yard  
Located at 

A new marshalling yard was opened at Hackney, just north of the station, on 17 December 1911. It is a useful staging point for freight trains travelling over the steep inclines of Dartmoor on the way to Plymouth, as these trains either have to be shorter or use additional locomotives compared with the flat route from Exeter.

The sidings were closed to scheduled traffic on 10 January 1971. They have now been refurbished, although the number of sidings is greatly reduced. These are split into two portions, one being left here while the Freightliner locomotive takes the first section forward before returning later in the day for the remaining wagons. The sidings are also used for stabling railway engineers' vehicles. In 2012, a new Network Rail recycling depot was opened; this has resulted in regular engineers' trains bringing sections of rail to the yard for cutting, before being sold to local scrap merchants.

Engine shed and works

Located at 

The first engine shed was established to the north end of the station, opposite Tucker's Maltings. A workshop  for the locomotive contractors was also established opposite the station and this was expanded over the years to include facilities for maintaining the railway's carriages and wagons. An old 0-4-0 locomotive, Tiny, was installed in the workshops to power the machinery. When it was no longer required for this role, it was restored and put on display on the station platform.

The original engine shed was closed in 1893 and a new eight-road standard GWR pattern shed along the lines of those at Salisbury and Exeter, with a northlight pattern roof, was constructed under the initial code NA. This made adding an ash shelter later during World War II especially easy. The single  standard over-girder pattern turntable was installed in 1926.

Designated and designed as the major shed for the region, it was constructed as a heavy maintenance repair shop. The associated locomotive factory had access to heavy lifting equipment and engineering facilities to maintain, repair and overhaul all types of GWR locomotive. Locomotives could be put into the factory roads by means of a traversing table at the east (Exeter and London) end. The last British Rail steam engine to be overhauled in the workshops was ex-GWR 4500 Class number 4566, outshopped on 15 July 1966. Although some steam engines belonging to the private Dart Valley Railway company were overhauled in the factory, after it had closed to BR work, and the old steam shed was also used to do some work on these privately owned engines.

To the west, the site also had a six-road carriage and wagon works, suitable for maintenance and repair of all types of rolling stock. Cleaning was carried out on tracks between the station and the locomotive sheds.

After the decision to switch to diesel traction, the site was completely rebuilt in 1962 to accommodate diesels, including the Warship Class that were used on the Exeter to Waterloo services. The factory was reformed to provide four roads with servicing pits and cab level platforms, providing facilities to repair eight locomotives at the same time. Access was via the existing traversing table. A daily servicing and fuelling point was built beside the old steam shed and it was this that provided the main facility after the factory closed in 1970.

Diesel multiple units were serviced in another open ended shed next to the carriage cleaning tracks; this shed was subsequently used to repair the electric train heating and air conditioning on the new Mark 3 and Mark 4 coaching stock.

The diesel repair sheds were closed in 1970, although a locomotive and coach servicing/fuel facility remained until 1981, when servicing was transferred to Laira Traction Maintenance Depot where the new High Speed Trains were maintained. An industrial estate now occupies the site. Two of the works' buildings survived into the 21st century; however, one caught fire on 29 October 2018 and the sheds were due to be demolished in early November. Five boys were later arrested on suspicion of arson.

Aller Junction 

Located at 

A proper junction, known as Torquay Junction, was put here on 29 January 1855 as the two single lines had now become part of the double-track line from Newton to Totnes; trains on the single-track Torquay branch running on the correct line between the junction and the station.

In 1874, the branch was extended to the station, running parallel with the Plymouth line as it had done before 1855. The tracks were (from east to west) down branch, up branch, down main and up main.

In 1914, along with the rebuilding of the station, it was proposed to install a flying junction at Aller to speed up the passage of trains coming off the branch. The plans were shelved due to World War I but, on 24 May 1925, a junction was once again installed where the two lines diverged, now known as Aller Junction. The four tracks were now grouped by direction of travel: down relief, down main, up relief and up main. Trains for either line could use either track between the junction and the station, but trains to and from the branch generally used the relief lines. This meant that trains coming off the branch had to cross over the line used by trains going towards Plymouth, which could cause delays at busy times. The junction was moved during the 1987 resignalling to a new position about  closer to the station. Trains can now run to and from the branch on a single line connection with their own platform or cross over to the Plymouth–Exeter tracks on either side of the station, as may be convenient.

A private siding was opened on the Torquay branch in 1866 for sand traffic from a nearby pit; it was removed in 1964.

Services

From the south, the trains of two different operators converge on Newton Abbot from Penzance and Plymouth on the main line and from Paignton on the Riviera Line. The main line service to London Paddington station is operated by Great Western Railway and runs at least hourly for much of the day, along with half-hourly local trains to Exeter and Exmouth. The London services include the overnight Night Riviera and daytime Cornish Riviera Express to Penzance, and the midday Torbay Express to Paignton. 
CrossCountry operate trains through Birmingham to Manchester, the north-east of England ( & ) and Scotland (& ).

References

Railway stations in Devon
Railway stations in Great Britain opened in 1846
Former Great Western Railway stations
Railway stations served by Great Western Railway
Railway stations served by CrossCountry
Buildings and structures completed in 1927
Newton Abbot
1846 establishments in England
Industrial archaeological sites in Devon
DfT Category C1 stations